Umraniye is a village in the Emirdağ District, Afyonkarahisar Province, Turkey. Its population is 67 (2021).

References

Villages in Emirdağ District